The 360s decade ran from January 1, 360, to December 31, 369.

Significant people

References